Mercedes Castellanos Soánez known as Merche Castellanos (born 21 July 1988) is a Spanish female handball player for CBF Málaga Costa del Sol and the Spanish national team.

Achievements
División de Honor:
Winner: 2018
Queen's Cup:
Winner: 2020

References

External links

Living people
1988 births
Spanish female handball players
People from Ciudad Real
Sportspeople from the Province of Ciudad Real
Expatriate handball players
Spanish expatriate sportspeople in France
Competitors at the 2018 Mediterranean Games
Mediterranean Games gold medalists for Spain
Mediterranean Games medalists in handball
Handball players at the 2020 Summer Olympics